Odendorf is a village in Germany, located in the municipality of Swisttal in the Rhein-Sieg district of North Rhine-Westphalia. As of 2007, the village had 3,581 inhabitants.

Local business 
Odendorf offers a wide range of local business. Situated in the village are an Edeka supermarket, also an Aldi as well a Rossmann drugstore. also a gas-station, post office, banks, pharmacy and several restaurants are based in the village. In a new business park further industrial business (manufacturing, wholesale trade) is located and land is still available for sale.

Infrastructure 
Also Deutsche Bahn offers a regular Regionalbahn service on the Voreifel Railway between Euskirchen and Bonn. Also a bus service to Rheinbach and Euskirchen (school-service only) is available. The nearest airport is Cologne/Bonn Airport.

Notable residents 
 Pius Heinz - Winner of the Main Event at the 2011 World Series of Poker.

References

External links 
 Website of the municipality Swisttal (German)

Former municipalities in North Rhine-Westphalia